Harry Tanfield (born 17 November 1994) is a British cyclist, who currently rides for UCI Continental team .

Career

At the British National Track Championships, Tanfield finished third as part of the men's team pursuit and second in the men's omnium. 

He won a Silver medal in the Commonwealth Games in the Men's Individual Time Trial.

On 3 May 2018 he won the opening stage of the Tour de Yorkshire road race, from Beverley to Doncaster. Later in May, Tanfield won consecutive rounds of the Tour Series criterium competition in Aberystwyth and Stevenage, and was part of the  team that won the series overall.

He left the team after one season, and joined  for the 2020 season. In October 2020, he was named in the startlist for the 2020 Vuelta a España. In 2022 Tanfield signed with the british team Ribble Weldtite.

Personal life
His brother Charlie Tanfield is also a medal winning cyclist. They are both born on the same day two years apart.

Major results

2012
 2nd Overall National Junior Road Series
2014
 5th Time trial, National Under-23 Road Championships
2015
 3rd Rutland–Melton CiCLE Classic
2016
 1st Stage 7 Tour of Poyang Lake
2017
 1st Stage 1 Tour of Quanzhou Bay
 2nd National Criterium Championships
 2nd Antwerpse Havenpijl
 5th Time trial, National Road Championships
 5th Duo Normand (with Charlie Tanfield)
 6th Hong Kong Challenge
 9th Memorial Van Coningsloo
 10th Ronde van Overijssel
2018
 1st  Team pursuit, 2017–18 UCI Track Cycling World Cup, Minsk
 National Track Championships
1st  Individual pursuit
2nd Omnium
3rd Team pursuit
 1st Stage 1 Tour de Yorkshire
 Tour Series
1st Round 5 – Aberystwyth
1st Round 6 – Stevenage
 2nd  Team pursuit, 2018–19 UCI Track Cycling World Cup, Milton
 2nd  Time trial, Commonwealth Games
 2nd Time trial, National Road Championships
 2nd Ronde van Overijssel
 2nd Midden–Brabant Poort Omloop
2019
 3rd  Team relay, UCI Road World Championships
2021
 National Road Championships
2nd Criterium
4th Road race
2022
 2nd Omloop Mandel-Leie-Schelde
 9th Ronde van de Achterhoek

Grand Tour general classification results timeline

References

External links

1994 births
Living people
British male cyclists
English male cyclists
Commonwealth Games silver medallists for England
Commonwealth Games medallists in cycling
Cyclists at the 2018 Commonwealth Games
Sportspeople from North Yorkshire
Medallists at the 2018 Commonwealth Games